= Al Khari =

- Location within United Arab Emirates
- Coordinates: 25°5′47″N 56°1′35″E
- Country: United Arab Emirates
- Emirate: Ras Al Khaimah
- Elevation: 282 m (925 ft)

Al Khari is the name of a village near Shawkah, in Ras Al Khaimah, in the United Arab Emirates (UAE). It sits at the head of the Wadi Shawkah.
